H. aurantiaca may refer to:
 Hylarana aurantiaca, the golden frog, a frog species endemic to Sri Lanka and the Western Ghats of India
 Hygrophoropsis aurantiaca, the false chanterelle, a mushroom species

See also 
 Aurantiaca